David Rodgers (born 1952) is an English footballer.

David Rodgers or Dave Rodgers may also refer to:

 David H. Rodgers (1923–2017), mayor of Spokane, Washington
 Dave Rodgers (born 1963), Italian musician

See also
 David Rogers (disambiguation)
 Dave Rodger (born 1955), New Zealand rower
 David J. Rodger (1970–2015), British author and game designer